Sally Nora Aitken  is a Professor and Associate Dean of Research and Innovation at the University of British Columbia. In 2017, Aitken was elected a Fellow of the Royal Society of Canada.

Career
After earning her PhD at the University of California, Berkeley, Aitken joining the faculty at Oregon State University. She was then offered a position at the University of British Columbia (UBC) as a NSERC Industrial Research Chair. In 2001, Aitken helped start the Centre for Forest Conservation Genetics at UBC alongside Tongli Wang.

In 2009, Aitken was awarded the Canadian Forestry Scientific Achievement Award and a year later was awarded the UBC Killiam Teaching Prize. In 2012, Aitken became a co-ordinator of the BC BigTree Registry, an online registry that documents big trees of each species in British Columbia. She also initiated (with co-Project Leader Andreas Hamann and collaborators) a large-scale applied genomics project titled "AdapTree" which aimed to use genomics and  climate-mapping technologies to help reforestation sites improve forest conditions, focussing on lodgepole pine and interior spruce. 

Due to her involvement with AdapTree, in 2014 Aitken was awarded the IUFRO Scientific Achievement Award for her research into the field of forest conservation genetics. She was also named a Wall Scholar in the Peter Wall Institute for Advanced Studies.

In 2017, Aitken was elected a Fellow of the Royal Society of Canada in the Life Science Division. In 2018, she was named the recipient of the Genome BC Award for Scientific Excellence by the non-profit organization LifeSciences BC.

Publications
The following is a list of publications:	
Genetic relationships among wood quality, growth rates and seedling physiology in interior lodgepole pine (1999)	
Conservation and the genetics of populations (2013)

Personal life
Aitken is married to forestry professional Jack Woods.

References 

Living people
Oregon State University faculty
University of California, Berkeley alumni
Academic staff of the University of British Columbia
Fellows of the Royal Society of Canada
Canada Research Chairs
Canadian women environmentalists
Canadian environmentalists
Canadian women non-fiction writers
Year of birth missing (living people)